Goeze is a surname. Notable people with the surname include:

Johann August Ephraim Goeze (1731–1793), German zoologist
Johann Melchior Goeze (1717–1786), German Lutheran pastor, theologian, and Christian apologetics writer

See also
Goeke